Rife House may refer to:

in the United States
(by state then city)
Rife Farmstead, Osage Mills, Arkansas, listed on the National Register of Historic Places (NRHP) in Benton County
Rife House (Rogers, Arkansas), listed on the NRHP in Benton County
Rife House (Shawsville, Virginia), listed on the NRHP in Montgomery County